Clinidium pala is a species of ground beetle in the subfamily Rhysodinae. It was described by R.T. Bell & J.R. Bell in 1985. It is known from its type locality in Guatopo National Park, northern Venezuela. Clinidium pala measure  in length.

References

Clinidium
Beetles of South America
Endemic fauna of Venezuela
Beetles described in 1985